Walter Grant Notley (January 19, 1939 – October 19, 1984) was a Canadian politician. He served as a member of the Legislative Assembly of Alberta from 1971 to 1984 and also served as leader of the Alberta NDP from 1968 to 1984.

Early life
Notley was born in Didsbury, Alberta, the son of Francis (Grant) and James Walter Notley, who were farmers. He graduated from the University of Alberta in 1960 with a history degree. After having been involved with the Alberta New Democratic Party in campus politics, he became the party's provincial secretary in 1962.

Political career
Notley ran for a seat to the Alberta Legislature for the first time in the 1963 as a candidate for the Alberta NDP. He was easily defeated, finishing last in the four-way race losing to incumbent Edgar Gerhart.

He also ran 1967 provincial elections, and in a 1969 by-election.

Notley was elected leader of the Alberta NDP in 1968.

Notley ran in the 1971 provincial election, he won a seat in the Legislative Assembly of Alberta in the electoral district of Spirit River-Fairview defeating incumbent Adolph Fimrite. He served as the Member of the Legislative Assembly (MLA) for Spirit River-Fairview, and was, for eleven years, the sole NDP MLA in the provincial legislature.

In the 1982 provincial election, he was joined by a second NDP MLA, Ray Martin, and the NDP was named the Official Opposition.

Notley spent his political career energetically building the social democratic NDP into a potent force in one of Canada's most conservative provinces.

Canadian psychologist Jordan Peterson worked for Notley and his wife from around 1976 to 1980.

Death
On October 19, 1984, Notley and five other passengers were killed near Slave Lake in northern Alberta when Wapiti Aviation Flight 402 crashed into a snow-covered, wooded hillside. Four people survived the crash, including then Minister of Housing, Larry Shaben.

A year after Notley's death, his party achieved a breakthrough. In the 1986 provincial election, the NDP, for the first time, won 16 seats and 29 percent of the vote.

Personal life
Notley's daughter, Rachel Notley, served as MLA (NDP) for the provincial riding of Edmonton Strathcona, from the 2008 provincial election to the present. She became leader of the party on October 18, 2014, as her father had before her, and she served as premier of Alberta, from May 24, 2015, to April 30, 2019. She currently serves as the Leader of the Official Opposition.

One of his two sons, Stephen Notley, writes the popular newspaper and web comic strip Bob the Angry Flower. His other son is Paul Notley.

Legacy
In 2010 the Peace River farm district Dunvegan-Central Peace-Notley was renamed Central Peace-Notley. Notley had represented the area as MLA from 1971 to his death in 1984.

A statue was erected in his honour in Edmonton's Grant Notley Park near Lemarchand Mansion, 100th Avenue and 118 Street.

Socialism and Democracy Essays in Honour of Grant Notley (NeWest Press, 1987) was published after his death.

The biography Grant Notley The Social Conscience of Alberta by Howard A. Leeson was published by UofA Press in 1992, reprinted 2015.

References

Further reading

External links
Legislative Assembly of Alberta Members Listing

1939 births
1984 deaths
Alberta New Democratic Party MLAs
Alberta CCF/NDP leaders
Canadian socialists
Victims of aviation accidents or incidents in Canada
Victims of aviation accidents or incidents in 1984
Accidental deaths in Alberta
20th-century Canadian politicians